NAMI-A, KP1019 and BOLD-100 are three ruthenium anticancer agents that have entered clinical trials. Contrary to what can be found in some papers, "the nickname NAMI is not the acronym of “New Anticancer Metastasis Inhibitor”, but has a much more prosaic origin. It was created by a student as a short-form name of the chemical formula of the complex: “NA” comes from the symbol for sodium and “MI” from the word imidazole. The corresponding imidazolium salt was simply called NAMI-A to signify that it was an upgraded version of the prototype NAMI".

NAMI-A, KP1019 and BOLD-100 are based primarily around the use of the metal ruthenium. Ruthenium is unknown to living systems, with a strong complex forming ability with numerous ligands.  Its partially filled 4d sub-shell allows it to form complexes that are useful for a wide variety of applications including catalysis, electronics, photochemistry, biosensors and anticancer drugs. Ruthenium, unlike traditional platinum complexes such as cisplatin, shows greater resistance to hydrolysis and more selective action on tumors.

Background 
New anti-tumor metastasis inhibitor or NAMI-A is a ruthenium based anti-cancer drug and is one of two ruthenium-based drugs that have entered clinical trials.

NAMI-A is considered a pro-drug formulation that becomes active upon hydrolysis. At pH 7.4, a chloride is exchanged with a water molecule, which neutralizes the molecule’s -1 charge. Upon lower pH, imidazole is cleaved and replaced with water.

Unlike cisplatin, a platinum based drug, it has been shown in-vivo that NAMI-A doesn’t inhibit primary tumor growth but decreases the speed at which metastasis occurs. It has also been found that when compared to highly cytotoxic platinum compounds, NAMI-A is much less cytotoxic and has a differing mechanism of action.

Preclinical trials 
Several preclinical trials were conducted in different model systems.

In 2002, a study published by Vacca et al. showed that endothelial cells incubated with NAMI-A, were not able to proliferate but that NAMI-A didn't kill the cells that were already grown.

One trial was done to test the efficacy of NAMI-A in female grafted with MCa mammary carcinoma cells. It was determined that, NAMI-A showed very little toxicity yet managed to decrease the rate of metastasis.  Perhaps most impressively is that, though NAMI-A is very sensitive to the environment, it is able to be effective over a range of conditions.

Clinical trials 
Clinical trials were conducted at the Netherlands Cancer Institute (NKI).

Phase I – monotherapy 
Phase I trials were conducted on NAMI-A in patients with varying solid tumors 3 hrs a day, 5 days a week, for 3 weeks at varying doses. Drug was given intravenously with and without a port-a-cath. Several side effects were observed including:
 Mild hematologic toxicity - blood related toxicity
 Nausea
 Vomiting
 Diarrhea
 Stomatitis – inflammation of mouth and lips
 Fatigue
 Creatinine increase – common toxicity (CTC) grade 1 and 2 - High levels indicate kidney dysfunction
 Fever
 Sensitivity reactions to drug
 Phlebitis at injection site
 Blisters on hands and feet
Of the 24 patients in the study, 20 were evaluated for final results. At the end of the study, 19 of the 20 showed disease progression while 1 patient showed no progression.

Due to these results, Phase II trials, using NAMI-A as a solo drug, were not pursued.

Phase I and II – combination therapy with gemcitabine 
Due to negative results of the stand-alone Phase I trial, and knowledge that NAMI-A slows down progression of metastasis, and not growth of the initial tumor, Phase I & II trials were done using gemcitabine, a nucleoside analog that has shown to be successful in treating lung cancer.

Phase I trial 
Phase I trials were done to determine the optimal and maximum tolerated dose (MTD)of NAMI-A as well as determining the pharmacokinetics of NAMI-A and gemcitabine administered jointly. This was accomplished by a dose escalation study. The minimal dosage was 300 mg/m2 on a 28-day schedule and the max dosage was 600 mg/m2  administered on a 21-day schedule. 32 patients were enrolled in the study all of which had a form of non-small cell lung cancer (NSCLC), a median age of 57, most diagnosed as level III & IV of disease progression.

Phase II trial 
Phase II trials were done to evaluate how NAMI-A in combination with gemcitabine impact cancer progression. 19 patients were added in addition to those from the phase I trial. Of the 27 patients evaluated for final results -15 showed anti-tumor activity, 10 showed stable disease progression for 6–10 weeks, and 1 patient exhibited a partial remission (PR) on the 300 mg/m2 for 21 days.

The patient who was observed to have a partial remission, occurred during the dose escalation phase I trial. In order to expand the trial, there needed to be at least one patient in the phase II trial that showed PR as the best response. Unfortunately, this did not occur. In addition, it was found that the results of NAMI-A in combination with gemcitabine, did not show improved results from studies done with gemcitabine alone.

Due to these results, clinical trials were terminated.

References

External links 
 NAMI-A

DNA-binding substances
Experimental cancer drugs
Ruthenium complexes
Imidazoles
Sulfoxides
Chloro complexes
Ruthenium(IV) compounds